Biologiya (Biology) is the third studio album by Nu Virgos.

Track listing

Vocals

 Anna Sedokova
 Nadezhda Granovskaya
 Vera Brezhneva

Release history

Certifications

References

External links
 Official Website

Nu Virgos albums
2003 albums